The House Small Business Subcommittee on Contracting and Infrastructure is one of five subcommittees of the House Small Business Committee.

Members, 117th Congress

Historical membership rosters

115th Congress

116th Congress

External links
House Committee on Small Business
House Small Business Committee Subcommittee page

Small Business Contracting